The Open Clarins is a defunct WTA Tour affiliated tennis tournament played from 1987 to 1992. It was held in the  Paris in France and played on the outdoor clay courts of the Racing Club de France. It was a Tier V tournament until 1989 and was subsequently promoted to Tier IV, raising prize money from $50,000 to $150,000. It was replaced by the Open Gaz de France in 1993.

In 2022, a WTA 125 tournament was introduced at the venue under its sponsored name, Trophee Lagardère, with a total financial commitment of $115,000.

Past finals (Open Clarins)

Singles

Doubles

Past finals (Trophee Lagardère)

Singles

Doubles

See also
 French Open
 Paris Masters
 Open GDF Suez

External links
 WTA results archive

 
Clay court tennis tournaments
Defunct tennis tournaments in France
WTA Tour
Tennis in Paris